This is the discography of American DJ and producer Erick Morillo.

Extended plays and singles

1992 The New Anthem (Funky Budda) (Reel 2 Real)
1992 Muevelo (Reel 2 Real)
1992 Te Ves Buena (Reel 2 Real)
1993 I Like To Move It (Reel 2 Real)
1993 Latin Flavor (R.B.M.)
1993 Gettin' Me Hot (Platinum Crew)
1993 Carnival '93 (Club Ultimate)
1993 The Boy (R.B.M)
1993 Rhythmz (Deep Soul)
1993 Unbe (R.A.W.)
1993 House Of Love In My House (Smooth Touch)
1993 Go On Move (Reel 2 Real)
1995 Carnival '95 (Club Ultimate)
1995 Reach (Lil Mo' Yin Yang)
1995 Conway (Reel 2 Real)
1996 Latinos (Reel 2 Real featuring Proyecto Uno)
1996 Mueve La Cadera (Reel 2 Real featuring Proyecto Uno)
1996 Jazz It Up (Reel 2 Real)
1996 Are You Ready For Some More (Reel 2 Real)
1997 Fun (Da Mob featuring Jocelyn Brown)
1997 Partay Feeling (B-Crew)
1997 Tripping (Smooth Touch)
1998 It's All Good (Da Mob featuring Jocelyn Brown)
1998 Distortion (Pianoheadz)
1999 Believe (Ministers De-La-Funk featuring Jocelyn Brown)
2002 Come Make Me Over
2003 Dancin''' (Erick Morillo featuring Harry "Choo Choo" Romero and José Nunez)
2004 Refresher (Time Of Your Life)
2004 My World (Erick Morillo featuring P. Diddy)
2005 Break Down The Doors (Erick Morillo featuring Audio Bullys)
2005 What Do You Want (Erick Morillo featuring Terra Deva)
2005 Waiting In The Darkness (Erick Morillo featuring Leslie Carter)
2006 Jazz In Your Face2006 Call Me (The Dronez featuring Shawnee Taylor)
2006 Tonite (MNM featuring Shawnee Taylor)
2006 Dance I Said (Erick Morillo featuring P. Diddy)
2007 Life Goes On (Richard Grey vs. Erick Morillo featuring José Nunez and Shawnee Taylor)
2008 Make A Move Harry "Choo Choo" Romero featuring Erick Morillo and P. Diddy)
2008 Where Are You Now? (DJ DLG featuring Erick Morillo)
2009 Say The Word (Richard Grey featuring Erick Morillo featuring Maboo and Nicole Da Silva)
2009 I Get Lifted (Erick Morillo featuring Deborah Cooper)
2010 I Feel Love (Ministers De-La-Funk featuring Duane Harden)
2010 Alive Markus Binapfl and Erick Morillo featuring Fiora
2011 Live Your Life (featuring Eddie Thoneick and Shawnee Taylor)
2011 Stronger (featuring Eddie Thoneick and Shawnee Taylor)
2012 Elephant (Alexandra Burke featuring Erick Morillo)
2012: If this Ain't Love (featuring Eddie Thoneick and Skin)
2012: Colors (Shawnee Taylor featuring Sympho Nympho)
2012: Love in me'' (Shawnee Taylor featuring Denis The Menace and Sandro Monte)
2012: "Flameco" H.Romero, A. Kenji and E.Morillo ft Mati	
2012: "Beat Of The Drum" TEKTONE ft Harry Romero 
2012: "Murder The Dance Floor" E.Morillo featuring Konshens ft S.Nymph
2012: "Prelude" T3ktone 					
2012: "Keep On Dancin" In the Screen ft Rachel Starr	
2013: "Addicted: J.Nunez & E. Morillo ft S.Taylor 		
2013: "Bang" Erick Morillo and Harry Romero 
2013: "The Porno" E.Morillo H.Romero J.Nune
2013: "Conga Lust"	E.Morillo H.Romero J.Nunez
2013: "Give It Up" E.Morillo H.Romero J.Nunez ft C.Fisher 
2013: "Jungle Blood" E.Morillo H.Romero J.Nunez and SJRM		
2013: "Palos & Drums" E.Morillo H.Romero J.Nunez	
2013: "My Melody:	E.Morillo H.Romero J.Nunez ft S.Taylor 	
2014: "Let The Freak Out" Carnage, E.Morillo, H.Romero ft Mr.V		
2015: "Trapped: Erick Morillo Limitless Part 2			
2015: "I Want You"	Erick Morillo Limitless Part 1
2015: "Something for Carl Cox: Erick Morillo 						
2015: "The Restorer" Erick Morillo featuring Harry Romero			
2015: "Devotion" E.Morillo and H. Romero featuring S.Taylor 	
2016: "Better Life:Junolar E.Morillo DJ Eako & Miss McClore		
2016: "This Is How We Do It" 	Erick Morillo and Junolarc
2016: "Thunder & Lightning" Erick Morillo feat Eli and Fur
2016: "Better Life" Junolarc, Erick Morillo and DJ Eako feat Miss Msclore 
2016: "Oooh" Erick Morillo featuring Angel Taylor 
2016: "Polar Bear" Erick Morillo
2016: "Lost In You" Erick Morillo vs Eddie Thoneick ft Angel Taylor 
2016: "Blinded" Erick Morillo and Junolarc
2016: "The Edge" Erick Morillo
2017: "Take Me Higher 2017" Mischa Daniels and Erick Morillo
2017: "Don't Belong" Junolarc and Erick Morillo featuring Ora Solar
2017: "No End" Erick Morillo featuring Kylee Katch
2017: "Gone" Erick Morillo, Junolarc and Chris Child featuring Ora Solar
2017: "Waves" with Kryder 
2017: "Evil Ecstasy" 
2017: "Bad Girl" with Junolarc featuring Ora Solar
2018: "Flashlight" with Junolarc featuring Redward Martin
2018: "Medication" with Jamie Jones featuring Gene Farris
2018: "Colombiano"
2018: "Cocoon" with Andrew Cole featuring Kylee Katch
2018: "Cartagena"
2019: "Fifth Element"

Remixes
2003: The Crystal Method - "Born Too Slow" (Erick Morillo Remix)
2013: Modjo - "Lady (Hear Me Tonight)" (Erick Morillo vs Who Da Funk Remix)
kMorillo vs. Who Da Funk? Remix) 
2016: Tom & Hills - "Energy in Magic" (Erick Morillo Mix)
2018: Erick Morillo and Andrew Cole featuring Kylee Katch - "Cocoon" (Erick Morillo and Harry Romero Remix)
2018: Erick Morillo, Junolarc and Chris Child featuring Ora Solar - "Pulling Me" (Erick Morillo and Harry Romero Remix)
2019: Eelke Kleijn featuring Ost - "Lost Souls" (Erick Morillo Remix)
2019: Antranig - "Jackin'" (Erick Morillo Remix)

References

External links
 

Discographies of American artists
House music discographies